Hakea varia, commonly known as the variable-leaved hakea, is a shrub of the family Proteacea and  endemic to Wheatbelt, South West, Great Southern and Goldfields-Esperance regions of Western Australia. It is a dense prickly shrub with creamy-white or yellow flowers and variably shaped leaves.

Description
The branchlets and young leaves have flattened, densely matted silky hairs, quickly becoming smooth. The inflorescence consists of 16-36 sweetly scented white-cream or yellow showy flowers in axillary clusters.

Taxonomy and naming
Variable-leaved hakea was first formally described by Robert Brown and published the description in Transactions of the Linnean Society of London. Named from the Latin varius - variable referring to the many differing leaf shapes.

Distribution and habitat
Hakea varia is a widespread species growing from north of Perth around the coast to Augusta and Esperance. Prefers winter wet situations on sand, clay, loam and gravel.  A frost tolerant species favouring a sunny or shady aspect. A dense prickly shrub good for wildlife habitat.

Conservation status
Hakea varia is classified as "not threatened" by the Western Australian Government Department of Parks and Wildlife.

References

varia
Eudicots of Western Australia
Taxa named by Robert Brown (botanist, born 1773)